The following is a list of releases by American punk rock band Anti-Flag.

Albums

Studio albums

Live albums

Compilation albums

Split albums

Video albums

EPs

Singles

Music videos

Other appearances
The following Anti-Flag songs were released on compilation albums. This is not an exhaustive list; songs that were first released on the band's albums, EPs, or singles are not included.

References

Punk rock group discographies
Discographies of American artists